The Revolutionaries (sometimes known as "Revolutionaires") was a Jamaican reggae band.

Career
Set up in 1975 as the house band of the Channel One Studios owned by Joseph Hoo Kim, The Revolutionaries with Sly Dunbar on drums and Bertram "Ranchie" McLean on bass, created the new "rockers" style that would change the whole Jamaican sound (from roots reggae to rockers, and be imitated in all other productions). Beside Sly, many musicians played in the band: Robbie Shakespeare on bass, JoJo Hookim, Bertram McLean, and Radcliffe "Dougie" Bryan on guitar, Ossie Hibbert, Errol "Tarzan" Nelson, Robert Lyn or Ansel Collins on keyboards, Uziah "Sticky" Thompson, Noel "Scully" Simms on percussion, Tommy McCook, Herman Marquis on saxophone, Bobby Ellis on trumpet and Vin Gordon on trombone.

In 1976, they recorded a track named after Kunta Kinte. This would become one of reggae music's most recognisable riddims which for many years was only played by selected sound systems on dubplate.

The band played on numerous dub albums and recorded as a backing band for artists like B.B. Seaton, Black Uhuru, Culture, Prince Alla, Leroy Smart, Gregory Isaacs, John Holt, The Heptones, Mighty Diamonds, I-Roy, Tapper Zukie, Trinity, U Brown, Errol Scorcher, Serge Gainsbourg among others.

Discography

The Revolutionaries
 Revival Dub Roots Now - 1976 - Well Charge
 Revolutionary Sounds - 1976 - Channel One/Well Charge
 Sounds Vol 2 - 1979 - Ballistic
 Vital Dub Well Charged - 1976 - Virgin
 Dread At The Controls - 1978 - Hawkeye
 Dub Expression - 1978 - High Note
 Earthquake Dub - 1978 - Joe Gibbs
 Jonkanoo Dub - 1978 - Cha Cha
 Reaction In Dub - 1978 - Cha Cha
 Sentimental Dub - 1978 - Germain
 Top Ranking Dub - 1978 - Rootsman
 Burning Dub - 1979 - Burning Vibrations
 Dub Out Her Blouse & Skirt - 1979 - Germain
 Dutch Man Dub - 1979 - Burning Vibrations
 Goldmine Dub - 1979 - Greensleeves
 Outlaw Dub - 1979 - Trojan
 Dawn Of Creation - Sagittarius
 Dub Plate Specials At Channel One - Jamaican Recordings
 Green Bay Dub - 1979 - Burning Vibrations
 Medley Dub - High Note
 Phase One Dubwise Vol 1 & 2 - Sprint
 Satta Dub Strictly Roots - Well Charge
 Dial M For Murder In Dub Style - 1980 - Express
 I Came, I Saw, I Conquered - 1980 - Channel One

Compilations
 Channel One - Maxfield Avenue Breakdown - Dub & Instrumentals - 1974-1979 - Pressure Sounds (2000)
 Revival - 1973-1976 - Cha Cha (1982)
 Roots Man Dub - 1979 - GG's
 Channel One Revisited Dub - Top Beat (1995)
 Macca Rootsman Dub - Jamaican Gold (1994)
 The Rough Guide to Dub - World Music Network (2005)

With The Aggrovators
 Agrovators Meets The Revolutioners At Channel One Studios - 1977 - Third World
 Rockers Almighty Dub (Dubwise, Rockers, Bass & Drums) - 1979 - Clocktower
 Agrovators Meet Revolutionaries Part II - Micron

Others
 Kunta Kinte - 1976 - Channel One
 Guerilla Dub - 1978 - Burning Sounds
 The Revolutionaries & We The People Band - Revolutionary Dub - 1976 - Trenchtown
 Bobby Ellis And The Professionals Meet The Revolutionaries - Black Unity - 1977 - Third World
 Derrick Harriott & The Revolutionaries - Reggae Chart Busters Seventies Style - 1977 - Crystal
 Sly & The Revolutionaries - Don't Underestimate The Force, The Force Is Within You - 1977 - J&L
 Sly & The Revolutionaries - Go Deh Wid Riddim - 1977 - Crystal
 Sly & The Revolutionaries With Jah Thomas - Black Ash Dub - 1980 - Trojan
 Errol Scorcher & The Revolutionaries - Rasta Fire (A Channel One Experience) - 1978 - Ballistic
 Ossie Hibbert & The Revolutionaries - Satisfaction In Dub - 1978 - Live & Love
 Pancho Alphonso & The Revolutionaries - Never Get To Zion - 1978 - Trojan

References

External links
 Roots Archives
Discography at Discogs

1975 establishments in Jamaica
1980s disestablishments in Jamaica
Jamaican reggae musical groups
Jamaican backing bands
Musical groups established in 1975
Musical groups disestablished in the 1980s
Greensleeves Records artists
Trojan Records artists